The 1938–39 Rugby Football League season was the 44th season of rugby league football.

Season summary

Salford won their fourth Championship when they defeated Castleford 8–6  in the play-off final. Salford had also ended the regular season as league leaders.

The Challenge Cup Winners were Halifax who defeated Salford 20–3 in the final.

Newcastle dropped out of the competition.

Salford won the Lancashire League, and Castleford won the Yorkshire League. Wigan beat Salford 10–7 to win the Lancashire County Cup, and Huddersfield beat Hull F.C. 18–10 to win the Yorkshire County Cup.

Championship

Championship play-offs

Challenge Cup

Halifax beat Salford 20–3 in the final played at Wembley on Saturday 6 May 1939 in front of a crowd of 55,453.  There would be no Challenge Cup competition in 1939–40.

This was Halifax’s fourth Cup Final win in five Final appearances.

This was Salford’s fifth Final appearance and second in consecutive years, having won the Cup the previous season

European Championship

The tri-nation tournament was played between November 1938 and April 1939 as single round robin games between England, France and Wales. This was the fourth Rugby League European Championship, and was won by France.

Match details

References

Sources
1938–39 Rugby Football League season at wigan.rlfans.com
The Challenge Cup at The Rugby Football League website

1938 in English rugby league
1939 in English rugby league
Northern Rugby Football League seasons